Height of Fashion may refer to:
 The Height of Fashion (album), a 2004 re-release of Fabrique by English new wave band Fashion
 Height of Fashion (horse), a racehorse
 Height of Fashion Stakes, a British horse race

See also 
 Fashion